Fibulacamptus is an Australian endemic genus of crustacean in the family Canthocamptidae. Two of the four species are listed as vulnerable species on the IUCN Red List (marked "VU"):
Fibulacamptus bisetosus Hamond, 1988 
Fibulacamptus gracilior Hamond, 1988 
Fibulacamptus tasmanicus Hamond, 1988
Fibulacamptus victorianus Hamond, 1988

References

Harpacticoida
Freshwater crustaceans of Australia
Taxonomy articles created by Polbot